Faisal Ahmed Hassan  is a Canadian politician, who was a member of the Legislative Assembly of Ontario from 2018 until his defeat in the 2022 Ontario general election. He represented the riding of York South—Weston as a member of the Ontario New Democratic Party.

Hassan is originally from Somalia. He emigrated to Canada in 1990, first settling in Winnipeg, Manitoba.

For over 15 years, Hassan was active in housing issues in Toronto with Midaynta Community Services, the Toronto Community Hostel, and Woodgreen Housing.
 
He was the NDP candidate in Etobicoke North in the 2015 federal election, and has worked as a constituency assistant to Paul Ferreira and Mike Sullivan.

Since the start of the COVID-19 pandemic in Ontario, he has been advocating for a moratorium on COVID-19 evictions.

He was part of Ontario's first ever Black Caucus, alongside NDP caucus colleagues Laura Mae Lindo, Rima Berns-McGown, Jill Andrew and Kevin Yarde.

Electoral record

References

External links

 Website: https://www.faisalhassan.ca/

Ontario New Democratic Party MPPs
Living people
People from North York
Politicians from Toronto
Somalian emigrants to Canada
New Democratic Party candidates for the Canadian House of Commons
Canadian radio personalities
Writers from Toronto
Humber College alumni
University of Winnipeg alumni
Black Canadian politicians
21st-century Canadian politicians
Year of birth missing (living people)